Hilkiah ( Ḥīlqīyyā, "my portion is Yah") was a Hebrew priest ("Kohen") at the time of King Josiah (reigned c. 641-609 BCE). His name is mentioned in II Kings. He was the High Priest and is known for finding a lost copy of the Book of the Law at the Temple in Jerusalem at the time that King Josiah commanded that Solomon's Temple be refurbished. His preaching may have helped spur Josiah to return Judah to the worship of Yahweh, God of Israel.

Hilkiah may have been the same Hilkiah who was the father of Jeremiah of Libnah. As such he would have lived in Anathoth in the land of Benjamin, and was the father of an influential family in the Kingdom of Judah.

Hilkiah is attested in extra-biblical sources by the clay bulla naming a Hilkiah as the father of an Azariah, and by the seal reading "Hanan son of Hilkiah the priest".

The Book of the Law
According to an account in 2 Kings (chapter 22) and 2 Chronicles (chapter 34), Hilkiah was a kohen gadol (High Priest) of the Temple of Jerusalem during the reign of King Josiah of Judah (639–609 BC) and the discoverer of "the Book of the Law" in the Temple, in the 18th year of Josiah's reign (622 BC).

Scholars almost universally agree that the book Hilkiah found was the Biblical Book of Deuteronomy. Scrolls and books of later antiquity, particularly those of the Greco-Roman rule in Judea, were summarily discounted by Hebrew biblical redactors. Conversely this book, whose discovery is touted in 2 Kings, was therefore believed to have been of an early enough authorship to validate, not only its inclusion, but the book's ultimate placement as the 5th of the "Five Books of Moses".

Extra-biblical sources
Hilkiah's name is mentioned on a seal ring and on a bulla.
The first object where his name is mentioned is a seal ring found in 1980. On the seal is a three-line inscription, in reverse letters, as is usual, so that the letters will read properly when impressed in a lump of clay. The script incised in the seal is what scholars call paleo-Hebrew, used by the Israelites before the Babylonian captivity, prior to the destruction of Jerusalem in 586 BC. The inscription reads: "(Belonging) to Hanan, son (of) Hilkiah the priest". It begins with the Hebrew letter lamed, meaning “belonging to”, indicating the seal's ownership. Then the name of the seal's owner, the name of his father and the function of the seal's owner.

The second object is a bulla found in Jerusalem in 1982. A bulla was used to seal a document. The owner of the document took a lump of soft clay; he affixed the clay to the string binding the document and then stamped it with his seal. This bulla was one of the fifty-one bullae discovered during excavations in the eastern slope of Jerusalem, in a clearly dated archaeological context. This collection of bullae was found in level 10, dated between Josiah's rule and the destruction of the city by the Babylonian king Nebuchadnezzar II in 586 BC, and more precisely from the highest ground of the building (level 10B). This level was destroyed by the final burning which baked the bullae and so provided a better conservation. On one bulla is a two-line inscription, in paleo-Hebrew script as on the seal. The inscription reads: "(Belonging) to Azaryah, son (of) Hilkiah". The inscription indicates the name of the seal's owner and the name of his father, but not his function.

Azariah and Hanan, sons of Hilkiah
Azaryah and Hanan, sons of Hilkiah, both held a sacerdotal function in the Temple of Jerusalem. In the late roster of high priests referred to in 1 Chronicles (6:13, 9:11), Azaryah IV was the successor of Hilkiah in this function and probably his eldest son, while his other son, Hanan, served by his side as a priest. The seals of the two brothers Hanan and Azaryah, engraved by the same master engraver, belong to what has been called the "generation of sons" and date, not from Josiah's reign but from one of his successors' (before 586). The seal of Azaryah was made before he became high priest because his function is not mentioned on it. The seal of Hanan and the bulla of Azaryah, two sons of the high priest Hilkiah, represent testimonies of the last years of Solomon's Temple, the first Temple of Jerusalem, before its destruction by Nebuchadnezzar II in 586.

Patrilineal Ancestry 
As per 1 Chronicles chapter 6

See also 
 Eliakim, son of Hilkiah

References

External links 
 Biblical Archaeology Society Online Archive

7th-century BCE High Priests of Israel
Jeremiah
Books of Kings people